Ilias Kantzouris (Greek: Ηλίας Καντζούρης; born August 11, 1973) is a Greek professional basketball coach who is the current head coach of AEK Athens of the Greek Basket League and the Basketball Champions League.

Coaching career

Professional clubs
Kantzouris began his coaching career in 2000, as an assistant coach, with the Greek club Apollon Patras. He then worked as an assistant coach with the Greek clubs Near East, Aris Thessaloniki, and Sporting Athens. Following that, he worked as an assistant coach with the Greek clubs AEK Athens and Panellinios. 

He was an assistant coach with the Lithuanian League club, Žalgiris Kaunas, in the 2011–12 season. He was then an assistant coach with the Russian VTB United League club, UNICS Kazan, in the 2013–14 season. After that, he worked as an assistant for the German League club, Brose Bamberg, from 2014 to 2018.

Kantzouris then became the interim head coach of Brose Bamberg, after head coach Andrea Trinchieri was fired by the team, in February 2018. He worked as Brose's interim head coach, until the club hired Luca Banchi, as its new permanent head coach.

On January 28, 2020, Kantzouris signed with Greek Basket League club Iraklis (his first official head coaching job), replacing Ioannis Kastritis.

On July 3, 2022, after 2 successful seasons with Kolossos Rodou, hw was named as the head coach of AEK Athens.

Greece national team
Kantzouris worked as an assistant coach of the senior Greece national basketball team, in 2013.

References

External links
Ilias Kantzouris at euroleague.net
Ilias Kantzouris at eurobasket.com
Ilias Kantzouris  at brosebamberg.com  
Ilias Kantzouris  at unics.ru

1973 births
Living people
Brose Baskets coaches
Greek basketball coaches
Iraklis Thessaloniki B.C. coaches